Cliff Watson (28 August 1916 – 1989) was a former international speedway motorcyclist who qualified for the Speedway World Championship final in 1949.

Career summary
Watson was born in Christchurch, New Zealand, but moved to Australia and represented the Australian national team at test level.

He joined the West Ham Hammers in 1947, progressing to heat leader status in 1949 and qualifying for the World final the same year. In 1950, after a poor start to the season with West Ham he joined the Harringay Racers and remained with them until the end of the following season. He rejoined the Hammers in 1952 but after a poor start to the 1953 season he decided to retire and return to Australia.

World Final appearances
 1949 -  London, Wembley Stadium - 15th - 1pt

References 

1916 births
1989 deaths
Australian speedway riders
Harringay Racers riders
Leeds Lions riders
West Ham Hammers riders